Sela (Sel'a) is a town in the north-western Anseba region of Eritrea. It is the capital of the Sela subregion.

References
Sela

Populated places in Eritrea
Anseba Region